Neolamprologus gracilis is a species of cichlid endemic to Lake Tanganyika where it is known from Cape Kapampa on the western coast and on the eastern coast from the area of coast below the Mahale Mountains.  This species can reach a length of  TL.

References

gracilis
Fish described in 1989
Taxonomy articles created by Polbot